JCI Nepal Nepal Jaycees (नेपाल जेसीज) is a voluntary organization; a membership-based NGO working in Nepal  since 1964 for developing the leadership skills of young men and women of this country. JCI Nepal is organization of young active citizens age 18 to 40 working in Nepal since 1964 for developing the leadership, personality and entrepreneurship skills of young people of Nepal. Dr. Bhekh Bahadur Thapa is the founder President of JCI Nepal (नेपाल जेसीज).

They are engaged and committed to creating positive impact in our communities. JCI Nepal is one of the National Organizations of (JCI) Junior Chamber International. JCI is founded by Mr. Henry Giessenbier. JCI has 120+ national organizations, 5000+ local organizations and 200,000+ active members. JCI Nepal has 150 Local Chapters along with 15000 members. JCI Nepal gathers young active citizens from all sectors of society. They develop their skills, knowledge and understanding to make informed decisions and take action in our communities. JCI Nepal is the seventh-largest Member Nation of Junior Chamber International. Currently they are active in almost every parts of Nepal.

Mission
To provide development opportunities that empower young people to create positive change.

Vision
To be the leading global network of young active citizens.

History

JCI Nepal is organization of young active citizens age 18 to 40 working in Nepal since 1964 for developing the Leadership, Personality and Entrepreneurship skills of young people of Nepal. Dr Bhekh Bahadur Thapa  is the founder President of JCI Nepal (नेपाल जेसीज).

Organizational structure

JCI Nepal is headquartered in Thapathali, Kathmandu and it has chapters in many parts of the country. It consists of a National General Assembly, a National Board of Directors, a Local Organization Member Committee, and General Members.
JCI Nepal Training School is a Training wing of JCI Nepal, which Provides various types of Training, Workshops to its leaders & General members.

References

Organizations established in 1964
Educational organisations based in Nepal
1964 establishments in Nepal
Organisations based in Kathmandu